Velbert (Low Rhenish: Vèlbed) is a town in the district of Mettmann, in the German state of North Rhine-Westphalia. The town is renowned worldwide for the production of locks and fittings.

Geography
Velbert is located on the hills of 'Niederberg' (meaning Lower Mountain), part of the Berg region, approx. 20 kilometres north-east of the capital of North Rhine Westphalia, Düsseldorf, and 12 kilometers north-west of Wuppertal on the south side of the Ruhr river.

Velbert stands on the highest part of the Niederberg region and also in its centre.  Its average elevation is around 230 metres above sea level; its highest point, at 303 metres, is the Hordt-Berg, and its lowest, at around 70.6 metres, is in Nierenhof am Deilbach.  The highest point in Velbert itself is 263 metres above sea level, at the corner of Friedrichstraße and Langenberger Straße.

Incorporation
As part of the reform of local government districts in North Rhine-Westphalia that came into effect on 1 January 1975, the formerly independent cities of Velbert, Neviges and Langenberg were merged to form the present city of Velbert.

History

Velbert was first mentioned in AD 875 as Feldbrahti and was ruled by the abbey at Werden.

Administration
Velbert is divided into three administrative areas, reflecting the three former cities: Velbert-Mitte (Central Velbert), Neviges and Langenberg. There are also numerous suburbs, including Tönisheide, Losenburg, Nordpark, Langenhorst, Birth, Röttgen and Hefel.

Politics
The current mayor of Velbert is Dirk Lukrafka of the Christian Democratic Union (CDU) since 2014. The most recent mayoral election was held on 13 September 2020, with a runoff held on 27 September, and the results were as follows:

! rowspan=2 colspan=2| Candidate
! rowspan=2| Party
! colspan=2| First round
! colspan=2| Second round
|-
! Votes
! %
! Votes
! %
|-
| bgcolor=| 
| align=left| Dirk Lukrafka
| align=left| Christian Democratic Union
| 12,730
| 40.9
| 12,352
| 50.4
|-
| bgcolor=| 
| align=left| Esther Kanschat
| align=left| Alliance 90/The Greens
| 6,686
| 21.5
| 12,132
| 49.6
|-
| bgcolor=| 
| align=left| Rainer Hübinger
| align=left| Social Democratic Party
| 5,148
| 16.5
|-
| 
| align=left| August-Friedrich Tonscheid
| align=left| Velbert Differently
| 1,915
| 6.2
|-
| 
| align=left| Cem Demircan
| align=left| Independent Velbert Citizens
| 1,862
| 6.0
|-
| bgcolor=| 
| align=left| Helmut Stiegelmeier
| align=left| Pirate Party Germany
| 1,262
| 4.1
|-
| bgcolor=| 
| align=left| Birgit Onori
| align=left| The Left
| 1,009
| 3.2
|-
| bgcolor=| 
| align=left| Marcel Stubbe
| align=left| Independent
| 521
| 1.7
|-
! colspan=3| Valid votes
! 31,133
! 98.3
! 24,484
! 99.4
|-
! colspan=3| Invalid votes
! 540
! 1.7
! 137
! 0.6
|-
! colspan=3| Total
! 31,673
! 100.0
! 24,621
! 100.0
|-
! colspan=3| Electorate/voter turnout
! 65,876
! 48.1
! 65,837
! 37.4
|-
| colspan=7| Source: City of Velbert (1st round, 2nd round)
|}

City council

The Velbert city council governs the city alongside the Mayor. The most recent city council election was held on 13 September 2020, and the results were as follows:

! colspan=2| Party
! Votes
! %
! +/-
! Seats
! +/-
|-
| bgcolor=| 
| align=left| Christian Democratic Union (CDU)
| 9,471
| 30.4
|  4.2
| 21
| ±0
|-
| bgcolor=| 
| align=left| Alliance 90/The Greens (Grüne)
| 6,543
| 21.0
|  10.2
| 15
|  8
|-
| bgcolor=| 
| align=left| Social Democratic Party (SPD)
| 5,435
| 17.4
|  9.7
| 12
|  5
|-
| 
| align=left| Independent Velbert Citizens (UVB)
| 2,343
| 7.5
|  2.2
| 5
|  2
|-
| bgcolor=| 
| align=left| Alternative for Germany (AfD)
| 1,998
| 6.4
| New
| 4
| New
|-
| 
| align=left| Velbert Differently (Anders)
| 1,643
| 5.3
|  1.3
| 4
| ±0
|-
| bgcolor=| 
| align=left| Free Democratic Party (FDP)
| 1,392
| 4.5
|  0.4
| 3
| ±0
|-
| bgcolor=| 
| align=left| The Left (Die Linke)
| 1,174
| 3.8
|  1.6
| 3
| ±0
|-
| bgcolor=| 
| align=left| Pirate Party Germany (Piraten)
| 1,177
| 3.8
|  1.3
| 3
|  1
|-
| colspan=7 bgcolor=lightgrey|
|-
| bgcolor=| 
| align=left| Independent
| 18
| 0.1
| New
| 0
| New
|-
! colspan=2| Valid votes
! 31,194
! 98.5
! 
! 
! 
|-
! colspan=2| Invalid votes
! 471
! 1.5
! 
! 
! 
|-
! colspan=2| Total
! 31,665
! 100.0
! 
! 70
!  8
|-
! colspan=2| Electorate/voter turnout
! 65,875
! 48.1
!  1.1
! 
! 
|-
| colspan=7| Source: City of Velbert
|}

Coat of arms
The first coat of arms was created in 1882 and abolished in local government reform of 1975. It showed the lion of the Counts, later Dukes, of Berg (originally the symbol of Limburg) and keys referring to locksmithing, a traditional industry in Velbert.

After 1975 a new coat of arms was created that included heraldic symbols for all three formerly independent towns. The key, referring to Velbert's main traditional industry, was retained with a simpler design. Langenberg is represented by an oak leaf, referring to the oak in the old arms of Langenberg. The chevrons in the bit of the key refer to the coat of arms of the lords of Hardenberg, from the coat of arms of Neviges.

Economics
The main traditional industry of Velbert is small scale manufacturing, mostly metal based, typical products include locks, hinges, small tools, hoseclamps. Most companies are small to medium scale and many evolved from backyard forges. There are also companies producing parts for the automotive industry, for example the suppliers of vehicle access systems Witte Automotive and Huf. As well as this Stein & Co Gmbh, the makers of Sebo vacuum cleaners, are based in the city.

Transportation
Velbert's S-Bahn service runs every 30 minutes line S9, from Recklinghausen / Haltern am See–- Gladbeck to Bottrop–  Essen-Nierenhof - Langenberg-Neviges - Rosenhügel-Wuppertal - Hagen, which is an attractive line to commuters. The old town of Velbert has no railway connection left. In 2011 most of the former railway line within the city was converted to a cyclepath. The former station buildings at Velbert-West and Velbert-Central are now restaurants, and the station at Velbert-Tönisheide is disused. All three were on the discontinued Niederberg Railway (Wülfrath-Velbert-Heiligenhaus–Kettwig). The operational stations serving the city are Langenberg, Neviges, Nierenhof and Rosenhügel.

Velbert also used to have a tram service, and was the meeting point of tramlines from Heidhausen, Neviges, Wülfrath and Hösel with Heiligenhaus.  Nowadays a number of  bus routes connect Velbert to the surrounding cities.  The city belongs to the Verkehrsverbund Rhein-Ruhr.

Twin towns – sister cities

Velbert is twinned with:
 Châtellerault, France (1965)
 Corby, England, United Kingdom (1966)
 Igoumenitsa, Greece (2012)
 Podujeva, Kosovo (2019)

Friendly cities
Velbert also has friendly relations with:
 Hacıbektaş, Turkey (2000)
 Morąg, Poland (2016)

Sites of interest

Theatres
 The central theatre of the town is in Forum Niederberg.

Museums
The town's museum is also located in Forum Niederberg. It is the German museum for locks and metal fittings. The museum exhibits a broad variety of keys and locks.

Buildings
 Maria, Königin des Friedens, or Nevigeser Wallfahrtsdom, also known as Mariendom, in Neviges which was designed by the famous architect Gottfried Böhm
 Hardenberg Castle in Neviges
 Historical town centres in Neviges and Langenberg
 Event Church in Langenberg
 Bürgerhaus (Citizen's house) in Langenberg
 Transmission towers in Langenberg for MW, FM and TV (303.7 m and 170m high)
 City hall incl. Thomas-Carré in Velbert-Mitte
 The Art Nouveau church called Christuskirche (Christ Church) in Velbert-Mitte

Notable people
Lüder Lüers (1926–2022), German horticultural architect, engaged in founding Kindernothilfe
Alexander Mies (born 1992), German racing driver
Dieter Ramsauer (1939–2021), German engineer

References

Further reading
 Horst Degen, Christoph Schotten, Stefan Wunsch (authors), Bergischer Geschichtsverein Abteilung Velbert / Hadenberg e.V. (editor): Velbert – Geschichte dreier Städte, J.P. Bachem Verlag, Cologne, 2009, .

External links

 

Towns in North Rhine-Westphalia
Mettmann (district)